Dingnan Subdistrict is an urban subdistrict in Puding County, Guizhou, China.

History
According to the result on adjustment of township-level administrative divisions of Puding County on January 29, 2016, Chengguan Town was upgraded to a subdistrict named "Dingnan Subdistrict".

Administrative division
As of January 2016, the subdistrict is divided into 12 villages and 3 communities: Tashan Community, Nanhua Community, Donghua Community, Xinhe Village, Xiangyang Village, Tianwangqi New Village, Renhe Village, Renbao Village, Longhei Village,  Longcai Village, Zhuguan Village, Dingnan Village, Chudong Village, Jinhua Village, and Yelang New Village.

Geography
The Yelang Lake is located within the subdistrict. It is very popular for boating, fishing and camping and is home to many residents from other areas of the province during the summer months.

Education
The town has two public schools: Puding County Experimental School and Puding County No. 1 High School.

Transportation
The S55 Puding-Anshun Expressway passes across the subdistrict north to southeast.

References

Divisions of Puding County
Subdistricts of Guizhou